The 2018–19 Dinamo Moscow season was the club's second season back in the Russian Premier League, following their relegation at the end of the 2015–16 season. They finished the season in 12th place, reached the Round of 16 in the Russian Cup, where they were defeated by Rubin Kazan, and officially moved into their new stadium, the VTB Arena, on the final day of the season.

Squad

Out on loan

Transfers

Summer

In:

Out:

Winter

In:

Out:

Competitions

Russian Premier League

Results by round

Results

League table

Russian Cup

Squad statistics

Appearances and goals

|-
|colspan="14"|Players away from the club on loan:
|-
|colspan="14"|Players who left Dynamo Moscow during the season:
|}

Goal scorers

Disciplinary record

References

FC Dynamo Moscow seasons
Dynamo Moscow